This is a list of palaces and mansions in Fejér County in Hungary.

List of palaces and mansions in Fejér County

See also
 List of palaces and mansions in Hungary
 List of castles in Hungary

Literature
 Zsolt Virág : Magyar kastélylexikon 3. Fejér megye kastélyai és kúriái - Fejér megye kastélyai és kúriái (Castellum Novum, 2002)

References

Fejér County
Houses in Hungary